Recorded at the London Arena on 11 December 1989 as part of the tour of their "Wild!" album and released in 1990 on VHS video, Wild! (live) is Erasure's third concert video. With 23 tracks and a running time of almost 90 minutes, it is the first of Erasure's live videos to feature an entire concert, except in the US where a much abridged 15-track version was released. In 1992 the concert was also released in the US on LaserDisc, still with only 15 tracks. In 2016 it was announced that the video will be released on DVD, exclusively as part of the From Moscow To Mars box set.

The concert included 9 of the 10 songs from "Wild!", as well as songs from all 3 of Erasure's previous albums, songs from the "Crackers International" EP and a cover version of Cerrone's "Supernature", a studio version of which featured as a b-side on the "You Surround Me" single.

Track listing

UK release

 UK VHS Video: 790407

 "Piano Song"
 "How Many Times"
 "You Surround Me"
 "Knocking on Your Door"
 "Brother and Sister"
 "Crown of Thorns"
 "Star"
 "Chains of Love"
 "Hideaway"
 "Supernature"
 "Who Needs Love Like That"
 "Stop"
 "Victim of Love"
 "La Gloria"
 "Ship of Fools"
 "It Doesn't Have to Be"
 "Blue Savannah"
 "Sometimes"
 "The Hardest Part"
 "Oh L'amour"
 "Drama!"
 "A Little Respect"
 "Spiralling"

North American release

 US VHS video: 38170-3
 US Laser Disc: LVD-9263

 Piano Song
 You Surround Me
 Chains of Love
 Star
 Crown of Thorns
 Supernature
 Who Needs Love Like That
 Stop!
 Victim of Love
 La Gloria
 Blue Savannah
 Sometimes
 The Hardest Part
 Drama!
 A Little Respect

References 

Erasure live albums
1990 live albums
Mute Records live albums
1990 video albums
Live video albums
Mute Records video albums
Electropop video albums
Live electropop albums